The 1946 College Football All-America team is composed of college football players who were selected as All-Americans by various organizations and writers that chose College Football All-America Teams in 1946. The nine selectors recognized by the NCAA as "official" for the 1946 season are (1) the All-America Board (AAB), (2) the American Football Coaches Association (AFCA), published by Look magazine, (3) the Associated Press (AP), (4) Collier's Weekly, as selected by Grantland Rice, (5) the Football Writers Association of America (FWAA), (6) the International News Service (INS), (7) the Newspaper Enterprise Association (NEA), (8) the Sporting News (SN), and (9) the United Press (UP).

Consensus All-Americans
For the year 1946, the NCAA recognizes nine published All-American teams as "official" designations for purposes of its consensus determinations. The following chart identifies the NCAA-recognized consensus All-Americans and displays which first-team designations they received.

All-American selections for 1946

Ends
Burr Baldwin, UCLA 
Hub Bechtol, Texas 
Hank Foldberg, Army 
Elmer Madar, Michigan 
Al Baldwin, Arkansas 
Richard Hagen, Washington 
George Poole, Army 
Wallace Jones, Kentucky 
Ray Poole, Mississippi 
Hank Foldberg, Army 
Len Ford, Michigan 
Browning, Denver 
Clyde Lindsey, LSU 
Ike Armstrong, Oklahoma A&M

Tackles
George Connor, Notre Dame 
Dick Huffman, Tennessee 
Warren Amling, Ohio State 
George Savitsky, Penn 
John Ferraro, USC 
Bobby Davis, Georgia Tech 
Bernie Gallagher, Penn 
Frank Wydo, Cornell 
Walt Barnes, LSU 
Bill Kay, Iowa

Guards
Weldon Humble, Rice 
Alex Agase, Illinois 
John Mastrangelo, Notre Dame 
Ed Hirsch, Northwestern 
Plato Andros, Oklahoma 
Joe Steffy, Army 
Arthur Gerometta, Army 
Knox Ramsey, William & Mary 
Herbert St. John, Georgia 
Dick Barwegan, Purdue 
Fritz Barzilauskas, Yale

Centers
Paul Duke, Georgia Tech 
George Strohmeyer, Notre Dame 
Bryant Meeks, South Carolina 
Chuck Bednarik, Penn 
Dick Harris, Texas 
John Cannady, Indiana 
Dick Scott, Navy

Quarterbacks
Johnny Lujack, Notre Dame (College Football Hall of Fame) 
Arnold Tucker, Army 
Ben Raimondi, Indiana 
Ernie Case, UCLA 
Bobby Layne, Texas 
Mickey McCardle, USC

Halfbacks
Charley Trippi, Georgia 
Glenn Davis, Army 
Herman Wedemeyer, St. Mary's 
Ray Evans, Kansas 
Charlie Justice, North Carolina 
Bob Chappuis, Michigan 
Clyde Scott, Arkansas 
Harry Gilmer, Alabama 
Forrest Hall, U. San Francisco 
Tony Minisi, Penn 
Lloyd Merriman, Stanford

Fullbacks
Felix Blanchard, Army

Black college All-Americans
During the 1940s, African-Americans were excluded from many college football programs. Many played the game at historically black colleges and universities (HBCUs). The major All-America selectors in these years did not include players from HBCUs. However, The Pittsburgh Courier each year selected its own All-America team from African-American players, including those at HBCUs. The players chosen for 1946 were:
 Nathaniel Powell, Florida A&M, end
 Roger Pierce, Langston, end
 Robert Drummond, Tennessee A&I, tackle
 Robert Smith, Southern, tackle
 French Nickens, Virginia State, guard
 Herman Mabrie, Tuskegee, guard
 John Brown, North Carolina College, center
 Nathaniel Taylor, Tennessee A&I, back
 Whitney L. Van Cleve, Tuskegee, back
 Raymond Von Lewis, Texas College, back
 James Turpin, Morgan State, back

Key
 Bold – Consensus All-American
 -1 – First-team selection
 -2 – Second-team selection
 -3 – Third-team selection

Official selectors
 AAB = All-America Board
 AFCA = American Football Coaches Association, selected for the Saturday Evening Post
 AP = Associated Press
 CO = Collier's Weekly
 FWAA = Football Writers Association of America
 INS = International News Service
 NEA = Newspaper Enterprise Association
 SN = Sporting News
 UP = United Press

Other selectors
 CP = Central Press Association, selected by college football captains
 WC = Walter Camp Football Foundation

See also
 1946 All-Big Six Conference football team
 1946 All-Big Ten Conference football team
 1946 All-Pacific Coast Conference football team
 1946 All-SEC football team
 1946 All-Southern Conference football team
 1946 All-Southwest Conference football team

References

All-America Team
College Football All-America Teams